Anna Nyíri (born 25 May 1981) is a Hungarian freestyle swimmer. She competed in two events at the 1996 Summer Olympics.

References

1981 births
Living people
Hungarian female freestyle swimmers
Olympic swimmers of Hungary
Swimmers at the 1996 Summer Olympics
Swimmers from Budapest